Udan Pirappu is a 1993 Indian Tamil-language action drama film directed by P. Vasu. The film stars Sathyaraj, Rahman, Sukanya and Kasthuri, while Thilakan, Nassar, K. R. Vijaya, Radha Ravi, Goundamani, and Mohan Raj appear in supporting roles. It was released on 15 August 1993.

Plot 

Sathya (Sathyaraj) and Vijay (Rahman) are orphans and best friends. Since his younger years, Sathya worked hard to educate Vijay. Vijay, a young graduate, works as a driving instructor until he finds an adequate job. Sumathi (Kasthuri) falls in love with Viji. Bhavani (Sukanya), a childish woman, does not get married because she is cursed; all of her fiancés died before the marriage. Ameer Bhai (Nassar) and Sumathi's father Marthandan (Thilakan) are friends and business partners. Ameer Bhai is involved in land grabbing and tries to sell Ganapathy Colony (wherein poor people, Sathya and Vijay live) to a gunrunner named Vadivel (Mohan Raj). Marthandan finally accepts for his daughter's marriage, but Vijay does not want to marry if Sathya stays single. Sathya gets married with Bhavani and Vijay with Sumathi. Marthandan knew that if Sathya and Vijay were together, he and Ameer Bhai cannot sell Ganapathi Colony. Even after the marriage, Vijay prefers to be with Sathya, so Sumathi becomes jealous of Sathya. Ameer Bhai, Marthandan, and Sumathi try to break their friendship in different ways.

Cast 

Sathyaraj as Sathya
Rahman as Vijay
Sukanya as Bhavani
Kasthuri as Sumathi
Thilakan as Marthandan, Sumathi's father
Nassar as Ameer Bhai
K. R. Vijaya as Sumathi's aunt and Marthandan's sister
Radha Ravi as Bhavani's father
Goundamani as Vellasamy
Mohan Raj as Vadivelu
R. S. Shivaji as Kondal Rao
R. Sundarrajan
Madhan Bob
Ajay Rathnam
Oru Viral Krishna Rao
Pandu
Mayilsamy
Swaminathan
Shanmugasundaram
Vaiyapuri
Radhabhai
Mohini in a special appearance
Shenbagam in a special appearance

Soundtrack 
The soundtrack was composed by Ilaiyaraaja, with lyrics by Vaali.

Release and reception 
Udan Pirappu was released on 15 August 1993. Malini Mannath of The Indian Express wrote Vasu "weaves into the script sentiment and melodrama in good measure and though he diverges from the main theme [..] he returns to the main theme [..] knowing where exactly the script value lies."

References

External links 
 

1990s action drama films
1990s Tamil-language films
1993 films
Films directed by P. Vasu
Films scored by Ilaiyaraaja
Indian action drama films